Luvsansharavyn Tsend (* 5 July 1940) is a former Mongolian speedskater, who competed at top international levels from 1964 to 1972, with best results in the longer distances. 

Tsend participated in three Olympics, Innsbruck, 1964, Grenoble, 1968 and Sapporo, 1972, with a 24th place in the 1972 10,000-m his best result. His personal best times are 42.1 (500-m, 1971), 2:14.9 (1500-m, 1971), 7:59.8 (5000-m, 1969), 16:10.2 (10000-m, 1970). Since his active competition days, Tsend has been coaching national-level speedskaters. 

Tsend was the first person in Mongolia to be diagnosed with hemophilia.

External links 
 Tsend is a front figure for World Hemophilia Day, 2011

Mongolian male speed skaters
1940 births
Living people
Speed skaters at the 1964 Winter Olympics
Speed skaters at the 1968 Winter Olympics
Speed skaters at the 1972 Winter Olympics
Olympic speed skaters of Mongolia